Ilya Sergeevich Malakov (born 2 October 1990) is a Russian theater and film actor. He is known for his roles in the films Furious (2017).

Early life
Ilya Malakov was born in Ryazan, Russian SFSR, Soviet Union (now Russia). In his school years he studied Greco-Roman wrestling.
He graduated from a specialized school with in-depth study of English. Then he entered the Ryazan State University named for S. A. Yesenin to the Department of Informatics and English. His parents received their education in the same university. In RSU he participated in the games of KVN for the university team, also tried his hand at dancing.

During his studies at the Ryazan State University, in his final year met Tatyana Yakovlevna Korobkova, his school teacher of the subject Culture of Language, who saw theatrical talent even earlier in Ilya Malakov. She even suggested that he try himself as an actor. She helped prepare Malakov for admission. One of the reasons for his wish to be admitted to the theater was the performance "Hooligan" starring Sergey Bezrukov, which he saw in 2011 in the Ryazan Philharmonic.

After graduating from the Ryazan State University named for S. A. Yesenin, he went to Moscow to enter the theater - he submitted documents to five leading theatrical universities. As a result, he was in the All-Russian State University of Cinematography named after S. A. Gerasimov, on the course Aleksandr Mikhailov.

In the first year of the Gerasimov Institute of Cinematography, his acquaintance with Sergey Bezrukov and Ilya Malakov was casting in his theater. Then he worked for a long time under the guidance of Bezrukov in entreprises, in particular Freddie played in the production of "My Fair and Unhappy Lady" (2013). When Sergey Bezrukov rose at the helm of the Moscow Provincial Theater, he noted the talent of the young actor and in 2014 invited him to the troupe of the Moscow Provincial Theater.

Acting career
Since 2013, he made his screen debut on the TV series The Ship on the channel STS, in which he played the role of Egor.
Then he played in the films The Village Teacher (2015) eleventh-grader Nikolay Agafonov and The Lords of Dreams (2015) a role of Grisha.

His first lead role was of Evpaty Kolovrat in the historical and adventure fantasy Furious directed by Ivan Shurkhovetskiy, released on big screens in 2017. The picture takes place in 13th century fragmented Rus.

Filmography

References

External links

1990 births
Living people
People from Ryazan
Russian male film actors
Russian male television actors
Russian male stage actors
21st-century Russian male actors
Male actors from Moscow